East Houston is a community in Houston, Texas, United States.

Government and infrastructure
The City of Houston Super Neighborhood #49 East Houston opened on August 24, 2000.

The United States Postal Service operates the East houston Post Office at 9604 Mesa Drive. In July 2011 the USPS announced that the post office may close.

Education
The Houston Independent School District serves East Houston. North Forest High School is the sole zoned high school.

Until July 1, 2013, North Forest Independent School District served East Houston; that district was formerly named the East and Mount Houston Independent School District.

References

Neighborhoods in Houston